Helen Iglauer Glueck (1907–1995) was an American physician known for her research in blood chemistry that linked bleeding disorders in newborns with a lack of Vitamin K in breast milk.

Glueck graduated from Walnut Hills High School in Cincinnati, Ohio in 1925. She obtained her BA from the University of Wisconsin–Madison and her MD from the University of Cincinnati College of Medicine.

She directed the University of Cincinnati Student Health Services (1945-1959) and then became Director of the Coagulation Laboratory at the University.

Honors
 1979 YWCA Career Woman of the Year
 1985 Hebrew Union College Founders Medal 
 1985 University of Cincinnati College of Medicine Daniel Drake Award 
 1993 named a "Great Living Cincinnatian" by the Cincinnati Chamber of Commerce

References
 Twentieth Century Women Physicians of Cincinnati

1907 births
1995 deaths
Physicians from Ohio
University of Wisconsin–Madison alumni
University of Cincinnati alumni
20th-century American women physicians
20th-century American physicians